Acronicta superans, the splendid dagger moth, is a moth of the family Noctuidae. The species was first described by Achille Guenée in 1852.

The wingspan is 40–45 mm. Adults are on wing from May to August depending on the location.

References

Acronicta
Moths of North America
Moths described in 1852